Ord Township is one of twenty-four townships in Antelope County, Nebraska, United States. The population was 79 at the 2010 census.

See also
County government in Nebraska

References

External links
City-Data.com

Townships in Antelope County, Nebraska
Townships in Nebraska